Ernesto Montemayor Jr. (3 March 1928 – 6 August 2000) was a Mexican sports shooter. He competed at the 1960 Summer Olympics and the 1972 Summer Olympics. His father, Ernesto Montemayor Sr. also competed at the Olympics.

References

1928 births
2000 deaths
Mexican male sport shooters
Olympic shooters of Mexico
Shooters at the 1960 Summer Olympics
Shooters at the 1972 Summer Olympics
Sportspeople from Monterrey
Pan American Games medalists in shooting
Pan American Games silver medalists for Mexico
Pan American Games bronze medalists for Mexico
Shooters at the 1959 Pan American Games
Shooters at the 1967 Pan American Games
20th-century Mexican people